B, la película (English: "B, the film") is a 2015 Spanish legal drama film directed by David Ilundain.

The screenplay is based on a stage work "Ruz-Bárcenas" by Jordi Casanovas, a transcription of testimony given in 2013 by Luis Bárcenas, former treasurer of the Partido Popular, to Pablo Ruz, one of the judges of Spain's central criminal court, the Audiencia Nacional.
Bárcenas was facing charges of corruption, and the title of the film refers to the Spanish term Caja B, meaning parallel accounting or a slush fund.
The main characters are interpreted in the film by Pedro Casablanc and Manolo Solo. It is a courtroom drama based on actual events, even though its screenplay is so faithful to reality, that it could be considered more as a documentary source rather than fiction.

Reception 
The film was not widely distributed, but received recognition from the critics. At the Goya Awards (Spain's principal national film awards) the screenplay was nominated in the Best Adaptation category and there were nominations for two of the actors, Pedro Casablanc (Best Actor) and Manolo Solo (Best Supporting Actor).

Cast 
 Pedro Casablanc - Luis Bárcenas
 Manolo Solo - Judge Ruz
  - Javier Gómez de Liaño
 Eduardo Recabarren - Gonzalo Boyen
  - Enrique Santiago
 Celia Castro - María Dolores Márquez de Prado
  - José Mariano Benítez de Lugo
 Ramón Ibarra - Miguel Durán

References

External links 
Official website

2015 crime drama films
Films set in Madrid
Spanish crime drama films
2010s Spanish-language films
2010s Spanish films